Alagar Koyil is a village in Madurai district in the South Indian state of Tamil Nadu. The history and living of the village is centered around Kallalagar Temple. Constructed in the Dravidian style of architecture, the temple is glorified in the Nalayira Divya Prabandham, the early medieval Tamil canon of the Alvar saints from the 6th–9th centuries CE. It is one of the 108 Divya Desams dedicated to Vishnu, who is worshiped as Kallalagar and his consort Lakshmi as Thirumamagal.

Kallalagar Temple

The temple is enclosed in a rectangular enclosure with huge granite walls. The central shrine houses the image of the presiding deity, Sundarabahu Perumal in standing posture. The images of Sridevi and Bhudevi are also housed in the sanctum. There are two life size images of Narasimha, the avatar of Vishnu. One of them is shown holding the demon Hiranya and other slaying him.

The temple houses some rare Vijayanagara sculptures similar to the ones present in Soundararajaperumal Temple, Thadikombu, Krishnapuram Venkatachalapathy temple, Srivilliputhur Divya Desam and Jalakandeswarar Temple, Vellore. The temple also has one of the unique deities Chakaratalvar (Alvar) where the god with chakram having 16 hands and 16 weapons is without Narasimha above him.

Chithirai Festival 

Chithirai festival of this temple celebrated for ten days is one of the declared festivals of Tamil Nadu government. This festival day is declared as a local holiday. In Chithirai (April-May), Lord Kallalagar starts from Alagar kovil in the form of Kallar
 and reaches Madurai on Pournami (Full Moon day). Here he steps into river Vaigai in his Horse Vaganam. Lakhs of devotees flock to river Vaigai to see this event. "Ethir Sevai" festival is celebrated on the day before Alagar steps into river Vaigai. It is a tradition for the people of Madurai to welcome Alagar.

As Alagar returns from Vandiyur Dhasavatharam, festival is celebrated throughout the night at Ramarayar Mandapam in the Northern part of river Vaigai. After this event, Alagar is taken to Mysore Veera Mandapam on decorated Anantharayar Palanquin. The next morning Alagar in the form of Kallar returns to Alagar kovil in ‘Poo Pallakku' (Palanquin decorated with flowers)

In the month of April and May, each year the great Chitra festival is celebrated on Pournami (full moon day). The Festival dramatically re enacts the visitation of Kallalagar to Madurai from Alagar Koyil. Lakhs of devotees flock to river Vaigai to personally witness the event of lord Alagar stepping down into the river and to get his blessings.

During the months of July and August the festival of Aadi Brahmmorchavam is being celebrated for 10 days. This festival occurs within the precincts of the shrine. Devotees from different parts of Tamilnadu throng to participate in this festival. The temple car ‘Amaiththa Narayanan’ is taken in procession during Pournami (Full-Moon day) of Aadi (Brahmotchavam).

References

Villages in Madurai district

Divya Desams